The Montserrat Amateur Athletic Association (MAAA) is the governing body for the sport of athletics in Montserrat.  Current president is Bruce Farara. It is also the body responsible for Montserrat's representation at the Commonwealth Games.

History 
MAAA was founded in 1971 and was affiliated to the IAAF in 1974.

Affiliations 
MAAA is the national member federation for Montserrat in the following international organisations:
International Association of Athletics Federations (IAAF)
North American, Central American and Caribbean Athletic Association (NACAC)
Association of Panamerican Athletics (APA)
Central American and Caribbean Athletic Confederation (CACAC)
Leeward Islands Athletics Association (LIAA)

National records 
MAAA maintains the Montserrat records in athletics.

See also
Montserrat at the Commonwealth Games

References 

Montserrat
Montserrat
Brades
Athletics in Montserrat
National governing bodies for athletics
Sports organizations established in 1971
1971 establishments in Montserrat